The western whistler (Pachycephala fuliginosa) is a species of bird in the family Pachycephalidae found in southwest Australia.  Prior to 2015, the western whistler was considered as a subspecies of the Australian golden whistler until recognized as a separate species following molecular studies that suggested a closer relationship to the mangrove golden whistler species complex.

Taxonomy 
The western whistler (Pachycephala fuliginosa) is closely related to the golden whistler (Pachycephala pectoralis). It was considered the same species until recently and is now separated due to its location and adaptations. The western whistler is found to be more closely related to P. fuliginosa rather than the P. pectoralis because of its location in south central Australia.

Identification 
Male western whistlers exhibit a black head and nape, white throat, black collar, yellow underbelly extending behind its neck. The feathers of the wing are covered with alternating olive and grey linear stripes, with a thin grey tail. The female has a similar body shape with lighter features on its grey head, white underbelly, and brown and grey wing feathers, with a grey tail. There are two subspecies of the whistlers acknowledged in modern research including the: P. f. occidentalis and the P. f. fuliginosa.

Location/habitat 
Western whistlers span from Kalbarri south and east to drier regions of south Australia and western Victoria. They are found in drier habitats, and are adaptable to their environment. Their environments include forested shrubland with dense undergrowth, soft land scrubs, woodlands, occasional garden parks, and exotic pine plantations. They live at varying elevations, as they are found in mountainous regions. Depending on seasonal changes some populations are resident throughout the year. Others migrate altitudinally, shifting to open lower elevation areas in the non-breeding season – this movement depending on age and sex. Adult females and juveniles will move prior to males in some populations, while in others males migrate while females do not.

Breeding 
The season for breeding runs from August to February with September to October being the prime breeding period. During breeding they couple together; and separate for the off-season. Occasionally western whistlers will stay paired through both seasons for life. During the breeding season, they are prone to territorial behaviour, which is shown through singing, rivalry and physical dominance. In competition for female attention, male western whistlers will make shrieking sounds that differ in pace and amplification. Males face the female in a strained position with wings spread apart circling the female in courtship. Females build the nests with undergrowth, twigs, and other forms of foliage.

Diet and foraging 
Western whistlers are omnivores with diets containing both other creatures and plant-life. They consume mostly invertebrates like spiders and insects. They also eat fruit and very rarely eat seeds. They incapacitate their larger prey before they eat it. Most of their foraging happens in shrubs and in the crowns of trees, and they do not often hunt on the ground. It has been found that there are some differences in feeding depending on the sex of the bird in some areas. They have also been seen interacting with other species of birds when foraging for their food, in most locations.

References

Joseph, L., Á.S. Nyári, and M.J. Andersen. 2014. Taxonomic consequences of cryptic speciation in the Golden Whistler Pachycephala pectoralis complex in mainland southern Australia. Zootaxa 3900: 294–300.

western whistler
Endemic birds of Southwest Australia
western whistler
western whistler